Every Letter I Sent You (stylized as Every letter I sent you.) is the first studio album and the first double album by South Korean singer-songwriter and record producer Yerin Baek. It was released through Blue Vinyl and published by Dreamus on December 10, 2019. It features 18 tracks, with "Popo (How Deep Is Our Love?)", "0310" and "Square (2017)" simultaneously released as the album's three singles. The physical album comes in a CD and LP format.

This is her first release under her new label, Blue Vinyl, after leaving JYP Entertainment in September 2019.

Every Letter I Sent You was met with generally positive reviews from music critics and debuted at number two in South Korea, selling over 35,000 copies. The album received nominations for Album of the Year at 12th Melon Music Awards, while its single "Square (2017)" won Best R&B/Soul award, and was also nominated for Song of the Year award.

Background and release
Every Letter I Sent You is Yerin Baek's first studio album released after the establishment of her independent label Blue Vinyl. On December 10, 2019, the "Popo (How Deep Is Our Love?)" and "0310" music videos were released on YouTube. The album includes a total of 18 tracks, was the result of Baek's four years from 19 to 22 years old, and was called her most honest and elaborate album to date.

Track listing
All tracks are written by Yerin Baek; "Point" co-written by Loopy. All tracks are produced by Yerin Baek and Cloud.

Notes

 The subtitle of "Popo (How Deep Is Our Love?)", "Meant to Be", "Mr.Gloomy", "Not a Girl", and "True Lover" are stylized in sentence case.
 "Can I B U", "Lovelovelove" are stylized in all lowercase.

Charts

Weekly charts

Monthly charts

Sales

Awards and nominations

Release history

Notes

References 

2019 albums
Pop albums by South Korean artists
Rhythm and blues albums by South Korean artists